Following three consecutive victories, the 1995 Eurovision Song Contest was once again held in Ireland. Eddie Friel was selected to represent his country with the song "Dreamin'".

Before Eurovision

National final 
The final was held on 12 March 1995 at the Cork Opera House in Cork. For the fifth year running, Pat Kenny hosted the event. The eight songs presented were voted on by ten regional juries.

Following its victory, the winning song "Dreamin'" caused some controversy following plagiarism allegations due to similarities to a Julie Felix song called "Moonlight". The second-placed song in the national final, "Always You", was for a while considered as a potential replacement for Friel, however an agreement with Felix allowed the song to continue in the contest.

At Eurovision 
"Dreamin'" went on to take 14th place in the contest with 44 points, breaking Ireland's record three-year-long winning streak. Ireland won again, however, the following year.

Voting

References

1995
Countries in the Eurovision Song Contest 1995
Eurovision
Eurovision